John Waters (July 4, 1829 – December 7, 1910) was a Canadian Liberal legislator who, from June 1879 to May 1894, represented the Ontario riding of Middlesex North in the Legislative Assembly of Ontario where, in 1893, he introduced a bill which would have given women the vote in provincial elections. He was born in Scotland in 1829.

From 1868 to 1875, prior to his service in the Legislative Assembly, Waters held the title of reeve, as the elected administrator for rural municipality of East Williams Township and, in 1875, served as warden for Middlesex County. He died at his London, Ontario home on December 7, 1910.

References

External links

Gemmill, John Alexander. The Canadian parliamentary companion, 1887

Ontario Liberal Party MPPs
Ontario Liberal Party candidates in Ontario provincial elections
Mayors of places in Ontario
People from Middlesex County, Ontario
1829 births
1910 deaths
Place of birth missing
Place of death missing